Beerlao (Lao language: ເບຍລາວ) is the generic name of a range of beers produced by the Lao Brewery Company (LBC) of Vientiane, Laos.

History 

The beer is based on locally grown jasmine rice; the malt used is imported from France and Belgium, the hops and yeast are imported from Germany.

Beerlao Original (5% Alc./Vol.), the original lager produced by LBC, is sold in 330 mL and 640 mL (1 1/8 imperial pint) bottles and 330 mL cans. It is available throughout Laos, and in Western-style restaurants in Cambodia. It is increasingly available in bars in Thailand. As of 2013, restaurants in Laos charge upwards of a base price of 10,000 kip for a 640 mL bottle, which is a little more than US$1. In some places, the beer is available in draft form (on tap). This is referred to as bia sot ("fresh beer") by locals.

In 2005 LBC launched a locally produced Carlsberg beer and two new Beerlao products, Beerlao Light with a lower alcohol content (2.9%) and Beerlao Dark with an alcohol content of 6.5%. These both come in 330 mL bottles. Beerlao Light has been discontinued.

In April 2008 LBC launched another beer brand, a 5% alcohol lager called Lanexang. "Lanexang" means "Million Elephants" and was the  name of a historic Lao kingdom, 1354–1707. Since its launch Lanexang Beer has been continuously gaining popularity among local drinkers though it is relatively hard to find.

A new beer, Beerlao Gold, was introduced in 2010. Its distinguishing ingredient is "khao kai noy" rice, which is claimed to give the beer a "...good scent and non-sticky texture,..."

In 2018 and 2019 LBC launched two new beer types; Beerlao White, a white lager, and Beerlao IPA.

The company claims to have a 99% market share of the national beer market in Laos, though this may have been eroded by the arrival of Singapore's Tiger beer on the market.

Beerlao was an official sponsor of the 2009 Southeast Asian Games held 9–18 December 2009 in Vientiane as well as most sports events in the country. They are one of the main marketers in the country and issues one of its most popular calendars, showcasing the year's winners of the Beerlao beauty pageant.

Beerlao has been awarded twice with a gold quality award (in 2006 and 2010) and once with a silver quality award (in 2003), granted by Monde Selection, the first International Quality Institute founded in Belgium.

Export 
Beerlao is now exported to the United Kingdom, the United States, Canada, Australia, New Zealand, South Korea, Ireland, Japan, Vietnam, Cambodia, France, Thailand, Denmark, Hong Kong and Macau, Switzerland, China, Singapore, and the Netherlands. It is available duty-free at most Lao border crossings, especially those with Thailand, where it is usually priced in Thai baht (from 20 baht per can, as of 2006).

See also
Lao-lao

References

External links
 Beerlao official site
 Beerlao USA
 Beerlao UK
 More Beerlao UK 
 Beerlao Rice Beer UK 
 Beerlao Switzerland
 Distributors of Beerlao in Thailand official site

Beer in Laos
Companies of Laos
Vientiane
Tourism in Laos
Laotian brands
Laotian drinks
Lao cuisine